Wouter Van Mechelen (born 8 April 1981 in Antwerp) is a Belgian former professional road and track cyclist.

Major results

Road

1999
 1st Overall Keizer der Juniores
 1st Overall Sint-Martinusprijs Kontich
 3rd Time trial, National Junior Road Championships
2000
 6th Nationale Sluitingprijs
2001
 3rd Internatie Reningelst
 4th Nationale Sluitingprijs
2002
 1st Grote Prijs Stad Geel
 1st Stage 5 Tour du Loir-et-Cher
 1st Stage 3 Ronde van Vlaams-Brabant
 2nd Dwars door het Hageland
 5th Paris–Roubaix Espoirs
2003
 1st Stage 8 Circuit des Mines
2004
 1st Stage 9 Circuit des Mines
 2nd Omloop der Kempe
 3rd Grote Prijs Jef Scherens
 4th Dwars door Gendringen
 5th Ronde van Midden-Zeeland
 7th Doha International GP
 10th Overall Tour de la Somme
1st Stage 3
2005
 2nd Leeuwse Pijl
 3rd Vlaamse Havenpijl
 4th Grote Prijs Jef Scherens
 5th Omloop van de Vlaamse Scheldeboorden
 5th Kampioenschap van Vlaanderen
 8th Overall Tour of Belgium
2006
 1st Leeuwse Pijl
 5th Tour de Rijke
 6th Paris–Brussels
 6th Flèche Hesbigonne
 7th Veenendaal–Veenendaal
 9th Memorial Rik Van Steenbergen
 10th Schaal Sels
2007
 8th Beverbeek Classic
2008
 3rd Omloop van de Vlaamse Scheldeboorden
 3rd Vlaamse Havenpijl
 9th Schaal Sels

Track

1998
 National Junior Championships
1st  Madison (with Andries Verspeeten)
1st  Omnium
1999
 National Junior Championships
1st  Points race
1st  Individual pursuit
2000
 1st  Omnium, National Championships
2002
 3rd  Madison, UEC European Under-23 Track Championships
2003
 National Championships
1st  Madison (with Steven De Neef)
1st  Omnium
2nd Points race
3rd Individual pursuit
2004
 3rd Six Days of Grenoble (with Iljo Keisse)

References

External links

1981 births
Living people
Belgian male cyclists
Cyclists from Antwerp